Retilaskeya is a genus of minute sea snails, marine gastropod molluscs in the family Newtoniellidae. It was described by Marshall, in 1978.

Species
Species in the genus Retilaskeya include:
 Retilaskeya albanoi Cecalupo & Perugia, 2021
 Retilaskeya bicolor (C. B. Adams, 1845)
 Retilaskeya chenui (Jay & Drivas, 2002)
 Retilaskeya elegantula (Powell, 1930)
 Retilaskeya emersonii (C.B. Adams, 1839)
 Retilaskeya horrida (Monterosato, 1874)
 Retilaskeya leopardus (Rolán & Gori, 2013)
 Retilaskeya papuaensis Cecalupo & Perugia, 2018 
 Retilaskeya philippinensis Cecalupo & Perugia, 2012
 Retilaskeya reunionensis (Jay & Drivas, 2002)
 Retilaskeya rufocincta Cecalupo & Perugia, 2013
 Retilaskeya valentini Cecalupo & Perugia, 2020
 Retilaskeya zelandica Marshall, 1978
Species brought into synonymy
 Retilaskeya nivea Faber, 2007: synonym of Cubalaskeya nivea (Faber, 2007)

References

 Gründel J. (1980). Bemerkungen zur überfamilie Cerithiopsacea H. & A. Adams, 1854 (Gastropoda) sowie zur Fassung einiger ihrer Gattungen. Zoologischer Anzeiger 204: 209-264

External links
 Marshall B. (1978). Cerithiopsidae of New Zealand, and a provisional classification of the family. New Zealand Journal of Zoology 5(1): 47-120
 Romani L., Rolán E., Mifsud C. & Crocetta F. (2018). Redescription of Retilaskeya horrida (di Monterosato, 1874) comb. nov. and a re-evaluation of the taxonomic affinity of the genus Retilaskeya (Caenogastropoda: Triphoroidea). Journal of Natural History. 52(1-2): 115-135

Newtoniellidae